Desmond Vernon Cohen (8 August 1927 – 24 February 2012) was a South African swimmer. He competed in the men's 200 metre breaststroke at the 1948 Summer Olympics and the water polo tournament at the 1952 Summer Olympics.

References

External links
 

1927 births
2012 deaths
South African male swimmers
South African male water polo players
Olympic swimmers of South Africa
Olympic water polo players of South Africa
Swimmers at the 1948 Summer Olympics
Water polo players at the 1952 Summer Olympics
Place of birth missing